Kukmaka is a small settlement south of Rašica in the Municipality of Velike Lašče in central Slovenia. The area is part of the traditional region of Lower Carniola. It is included in the Central Slovenia Statistical Region.

References

External links
Kukmaka on Geopedia

Populated places in the Municipality of Velike Lašče